This is a list of notable alumni of Lehigh University, an American private research university located in Bethlehem, Pennsylvania.

Academia
David A. Bader (BSCompE, 1990; MSEE, 1991), Distinguished Professor of Computer Science at the New Jersey Institute of Technology, former professor at Georgia Tech
Anthony G. Collins (D.Eng. Civil Eng., 1982), President, Clarkson University
Peter D. Feaver (BA, 1983), member of the National Security Council in the Clinton and Bush administrations and professor at Duke University
James D. Foley (BSEE, 1964), professor at Georgia Tech, co-author of Computer Graphics: Principles and Practice
Kenneth French (Mech. E., 1976), Finance Department Chairman at Dartmouth College; President of the American Finance Association
Robert L. Ketter, former president of the University of Buffalo
Andrew H. Knoll (1973), paleontologist and geologist at Harvard University, member of the National Academy of Sciences.
Ted London (BS Mech. Eng 1985), American scholar and teacher on Base of the Pyramid (BoP) issues at the Stephen M. Ross School of Business, senior research fellow at the William Davidson Institute
Robert J. Nemiroff (1987), professor of physics at Michigan Technological University; cofounder of Astronomy Picture of the Day and Astrophysics Source Code Library
Paul C. Paris (1955), Professor emeritus at Washington University in St. Louis, expert on fracture mechanics and fatigue (material)
Walter C. Pitman, III (1956), Professor emeritus at Columbia University, expert on sea floor spreading
James R. Rice (1962), physicist and professor at Harvard University, member of the National Academy of Sciences and National Academy of Engineering.
Herman Schneider (1894), President of the University of Cincinnati and key developer of the concept of cooperative education
James E. Talmage (Geology, 1884), former president of the University of Utah, author, and LDS apostle
John Texter (1949), Professor Emeritus of Polymer and Coating Technology in School of Engineering at Eastern Michigan University; cofounder of Strider Research Corporation; author; inventor.
Paul Torgersen (B.S. Industrial Engr., 1953), former president of Virginia Polytechnic Institute and State University

Architecture
Roland E. Borhek (1883), noted architect in Tacoma, Washington, designed the Rialto Theater and Crescent Ballroom among other buildings
Wallis Eastburn Howe (1889), attended the Massachusetts Institute of Technology, became noted Rhode Island architect

Business
William Amelio (BS Chem. Eng., 1979), CEO of Avnet, former CEO of Lenovo
Tom Bayer, member of the board of directors of the Reserve Bank of Vanuatu
Patrice Banks, founder of the Girls Auto Clinic, author
William Butterworth, president and chairman of the board, John Deere and Company
Steve Chang, co-founder and former CEO of Trend Micro
Stacey Cunningham (BS Industrial Engineering, 1996), 67th president of the New York Stock Exchange
Jack Dreyfus (1934), founder of the Dreyfus Fund
Cathy Engelbert (1986), former CEO of the U.S. arm of Deloitte; WNBA commissioner (2019–present)
Murray H. Goodman (born 1925), real estate developer
Eugene Grace (1899), former president of Bethlehem Steel
Richard Hayne (BA Anthropology 1969), co-founder of Urban Outfitters, Anthropologie and Free People
Marc Holtzman (1982), vice-chairman Barclays Capital and chairman of the board of Kazkommertsbank in Kazakhstan
Lee Iacocca (Industrial Eng. 1945, Hon D.Eng. 1965), former chairman of Chrysler Corporation
Kevin J. Kennedy (1978), CEO of Avaya
John E. McGlade, chairman, chief executive officer and president of Air Products
Reginald Lenna (BS Industrial Engineering, 1936), CEO Blackstone Corporation
Edward Avery McIlhenny (1896), CEO of McIlhenny Company, makers of Tabasco sauce
Henry H. Minskoff, real estate developer
James Ward Packard (Mech. E., 1884), co-founder of Packard Motor Company
John R. Patrick (BS Electrical Engineering, 1967), former IBM vice president
Joseph R. Perella (BS Business & Economics 1964), former chairman of Investment Banking, Morgan Stanley
 Paul Zane Pilzer (BA Journalism 1974), economist
 Barry Rosenstein (BA, 1981), hedge fund manager
 Fredrick D. Schaufeld (BA Government 1981), entrepreneur, venture capital investor
Tsai Shengbai (1919), President of Mayar Silk Mills and developer of the modern silk industry in China
Fred Trump Jr. (1960), pilot for Trans World Airlines, former executive and maintenance worker at The Trump Organization; older brother of the 45th President of the United States Donald Trump
 Robert Zoellner (BS 1954), investor and stamp collector; second person to have assembled a complete collection of United States postage stamps; benefactor and namesake of the school's Zoellner Arts Center

Entertainment
Dick Berg (1942), screenwriter
Tracy Byrnes (1993), TV Business Reporter on Fox Business News
Jim Davidson (1985), actor, TV show Pacific Blue
Paul Guilfoyle (1972), actor, CSI: Crime Scene Investigation
Maria Jacquemetton (BA English, 1983), Emmy, Golden Globe, Writers Guild of America, and Peabody Award-winning writer and supervising producer of TV show Mad Men
Don Most (1972), actor, Happy Days (attended Lehigh University but did not graduate) 
Louis Clyde Stoumen (1939), Academy Award-winning director and producer
Andrea Tantaros (2001), political contributor on Fox News Channel

Journalism and literature
Martin Baron (BA Journalism & MBA, both 1976), editor of  The Washington Post, former editor of The Boston Globe
William E. Coles, Jr. (BA English, 1953), novelist and professor
Richard Harding Davis (1886), war correspondent, journalist and writer of fiction and drama
Robert Gibb (MA English, 1976), poet, short-story writer, essayist, critic, editor, and professor
Michael Golden (1971), publisher of The International Herald Tribune; Vice Chairman of The New York Times Company
William P. Gottlieb (BS Business & Economics, 1939), jazz author and photographer
Russell Lee (1925), photojournalist
Edwin Lefèvre (1893), journalist, one of the first specializing in business coverage
David A. Randall (English, 1928), book dealer and librarian
Len Roberts (PhD English, 1976), poet, translator, and professor
Stephanie Ruhle (1997), MSNBC anchor and NBC News correspondent 
Michael Smerconish (BA Government, 1984), author and radio commentator
Les Whitten (BA English & Journalism, 1950), investigative reporter and novelist

Law
Edward N. Cahn (1955), Judge of the United States District Court for the Eastern District of Pennsylvania. The Edward Cahn Federal Building and Courthouse was named in his honor.
Robert L. Clifford (1946), Associate Justice of the New Jersey Supreme Court
James Cullen Ganey (1920), Judge of the United States Court of Appeals for the Third Circuit
Ronald A. Guzman (1970), Judge of the United States District Court for the Northern District of Illinois
Edwin Kneedler (1967), Deputy Solicitor General of the United States
Paul Lewis Maloney (1972), Judge of the United States District Court for the Western District of Michigan
Malcolm Muir (1935), Judge of the United States District Court for the Middle District of Pennsylvania
Maryellen Noreika (1988), Judge of the United States District Court for the District of Delaware
Donald F. Parsons (1973), Vice Chancellor of the Court of Chancery of the State of Delaware
Stephen Victor Wilson (1963), Judge of the United States District Court for the Central District of California

Medicine
Dr. Harry J. Buncke, plastic surgeon, called the "father of microsurgery"
Dr. Steven J. Burakoff, cancer specialist; head of Mount Sinai Medical Center's Cancer Institute
Dr. Gail Saltz, psychiatrist and TV commentator
Dr. Sandra Welner, specialist in disabled women's healthcare
 Dr. Stephen K. Klasko, CEO Jefferson Health
Dr. Frank L. Douglas, former CEO TheVax Genetics Vaccine Company; Founder and First Executive Director of the MIT Center for Biomedical Innovation

Military
Maj. Ralph Cheli (1941), USAAF, awarded the Medal of Honor posthumously for valor in World War II
Vice Adm. Colin J. Kilrain (1982), US Navy SEAL, anti-terrorism expert,  military attache to Mexico,  PACCOM Special Ops Commander, NATO Special Ops Commander
Maj. David M. Peterson (1915), fighter ace with the Lafayette Escadrille and US Army Air Service; credited with six victories; awarded the Distinguished Service Cross twice
Brig Gen Edwin H. Simmons USMC (1942), veteran of the Battle of Chosin Reservoir and USMC Chief Historian
Capt. Frank "Chuck" Spinney (BS Mech. Eng, 1967), USAFR, military analyst
Gen. John H. Tilelli, Jr. (MBA 1972), Vice Chief of Staff of the United States Army
Lt Gen Timothy D. Haugh (BA 1991), Current Sixteenth Air Force Commander

Politics
Pongpol Adireksarn (1964), Deputy Prime Minister of Thailand
William David Blakeslee Ainey, United States Congressman
Ali Al-Naimi (BS Geology 1962), Saudi Arabia Minister of Petroleum and Mineral Resources and Chairman of Aramco
Carville Benson (1890), United States Congressman
William A. Collins, state representative and four-term mayor of Norwalk, Connecticut, 1977-1981 and 1983-1987
Charlie Dent (MPA, 1993), United States Congressman
Geoff Diehl (1992), member of the Massachusetts House of Representatives
 Clarence Ditlow III, (Bachelor of Science (BS) Chemical Engineering), advocate for automotive safety
Manuel V. Domenech (1888), Mayor of Ponce, Puerto Rico; Treasurer of the Commonwealth of Puerto Rico
Lori Ehrlich (1985), member of the Massachusetts House of Representatives
Peter D. Feaver (BA, 1983), member of the National Security Council in the Clinton and Bush administrations; professor at Duke University
Robert L. Freeman (MA History, 1984), member of the Pennsylvania House of Representatives
Walter O. Hoffecker (1877), U.S. House of Representatives
Robert A. Hurley (1917), 73rd Governor of Connecticut
Leonard Lance (Bachelor of Arts (BA), 1974), U.S. House of Representatives, 2008-, NJ-7 GOP
Norton Lewis Lichtenwalner, U.S. House of Representatives
Jennifer Mann (1991), member and Majority Caucus Secretary of the Pennsylvania House of Representatives
Robert Martin (Master of Arts (MA) History, 1971),  New Jersey State Senator
Paul F. McHale, Jr.  (Bachelor of Arts (BA) Government, 1972), Assistant Secretary of Defense for Homeland Defense and former United States Congressman.
Rufus King Polk (1887), U.S. House of Representatives
Donald L. Ritter (Bachelor of Science (BS) Metallurgy, 1961), United States Congressman from the Fifteenth District, Pennsylvania, 1979–1993
Richard Schmierer (1974), United States Ambassador to Oman
David Sidikman (1956), New York State Assemblyman
Donald Snyder (MBA 1976), member of the Pennsylvania House of Representatives, 1981–2000; Majority Whip
Edward J. Stack (1931), U.S. House of Representatives
Guy Talarico (B.S.), member of the New Jersey General Assembly
Joseph Uliana (1987), Pennsylvania State Representative and State Senator
Richard Rahul Verma (BS Industrial Engineering, 1990), United States Ambassador to India
Francis E. Walter (1916), U.S. House of Representatives

Pulitzer Prize winners
Martin Baron (1976), editor of The Washington Post, former editor of The Boston Globe, 2003 Pulitzer Prize winner
Mark Antony De Wolfe Howe (1886)  1925 Pulitzer Prize winner
Joe Morgenstern (BA English, 1953), 2005 Pulitzer Prize winner

Science and engineering
Ali Al-Naimi (BS Geology, 1962), CEO, Saudi Aramco, formerly Arabian American Oil Company, 1984–1995; Minister of Petroleum and Mineral Resources, Saudi Arabia, 1995–present
Walter C. Bachman (1933), authority on ship propulsion and Chief Engineer at Gibbs & Cox
John-David F. Bartoe (BS Physics 1966), Space Shuttle astronaut and ISS research manager for NASA
Stephen James Benkovic (1960), chemist
 William Bowie (C.E. 1895), geodetic engineer; namesake of Bowie Seamount
Morris Llewellyn Cooke (BS Mech. E., 1895), known for his rural electrification efforts in the U.S. during the 1920s and 1930s
Paul Corkum (PhD Theoretical Physics, 1972), attosecond physics and laser science
Albert P. Crary (MS Physics), Antarctic explorer
Harry Diamond Noted Engineer, developed Proximity Fuse
Philip Drinker (Chem Eng., 1917), co-inventor of the modern respirator
Lt. Col. Terry Hart, USAF (BS Mech. E., 1968, Hon. D.Eng., 1988), NASA Space Shuttle astronaut
Captain Nicholas H. Heck (AB 1903, BSCE 1904), geophysicist, seismologist, oceanographer, hydrographic surveyor, and United States Coast and Geodetic Survey officer
Lester Hogan (PhD Physics 1950), microwave and semiconductor pioneer
Gary G. Lash (MS, PhD 1980), geologist known for Marcellus Shale calculations, 2011 Foreign Policy Top 100 Global Thinkers
Bill Maloney (1980), mine drilling expert and participant in the Plan B rescue of miners during the 2010 Chilean mine disaster
Daniel McFarlan Moore (1889), inventor of the Moore Light, predecessor to the neon and fluorescent lamp
William S. Murray (1895), expert in electrical power generation and electrification of railroads
Jesse W. Reno (BS Mech Eng., 1883), builder of the world's first escalator
Robert Serber (BS Engineering Physics, 1930), physicist who participated in the Manhattan Project
Lewis B. Stillwell (1885), expert on electrical distribution, President of the IEEE and 1935 winner of the IEEE Edison Medal
John Texter (1949; BSEE, 1971; MS Chem, 1973; MS Mathematics, 1976; PhD Chemistry, 1976), engineer and scientist known for his work in applied dispersion technology and small particle science; co-initiator of polymerized ionic liquids; designed thermodynamically stable dispersions
John M. Thome (1870) Director of the Argentine National Observatory (today Observatorio Astronómico de Córdoba)
Richard Hawley Tucker (BS Civil Eng., 1887), astronomer; namesake of Tucker Crater on the Moon
Claude Allen Porter Turner  (BS Civil Eng., 1890), developed many early reinforced concrete techniques
Aneesh Varma (2006), founder of Aire, known for work in behavior prediction algorithms
William Wiswesser (1936; honorary doctorate 1970), chemist and pioneer in chemical informatics; inventor of Wiswesser line notation
J. Lamar Worzel (1941), geophysicist and oceanographer
Zhou Ming-Zhen, Chinese paleontologist, Academician of the Chinese Academy of Sciences, recipient of the Romer-Simpson Medal

Sports
Rabih Abdullah (1998), former NFL running back for the Tampa Bay Buccaneers, Chicago Bears, and New England Patriots
Joe Alleva (BS Finance, 1975; MBA, 1976), athletics director at Louisiana State University; former the athletics director at Duke University
Craig Anderson (1960), former MLB pitcher for the New York Mets and St. Louis Cardinals
Lon Babby (BA Political Science, 1973), President of Phoenix Suns
Adam Bergen (2004), National Football League tight end for Arizona Cardinals and Dallas Cowboys
Jordan Cohen ('20), American-Israeli basketball player in the Israel Basketball Premier League
Snooks Dowd, Lehigh football star in 1918; Major League Baseball player
Cathy Engelbert (1986), WNBA Commissioner
Sam Fishburn, Major League Baseball player
John Fitch (BS Civil Eng., 1938), winner of Mille Miglia and Argentine Grand Prix
Paul Hartzell (1976), former MLB pitcher, California Angels, Minnesota Twins, and Baltimore Orioles
Bill Hoffman, football player
Al Holbert (Mech. E. 1968), five-time IMSA GT Champion and member of International Motorsports Hall of Fame
John Hill (1972), former National Football League Center for the New York Giants  and New Orleans Saints
Jarrod Johnson (1991), former National Football League Center/Offensive Guard for the Pittsburgh Steelers and San Diego Chargers
Steve Kreider (1978), former wide receiver for the Cincinnati Bengals, played in the Bengals' first Super Bowl appearance; while at Lehigh played on the 1977 national championship team 
Tim Mayer (1991), motorsports organizer and official; COO of IMSA and ALMS, ACCUS, FIA  former CART official
Matt McBride, Major League Baseball outfielder for the Colorado Rockies
CJ McCollum (BA Journalism, 2013), NBA; led Lehigh to victory over Duke; first Lehigh player selected in the NBA Draft
Kim McQuilken (1973), Lehigh football player and a former quarterback in the NFL for the Atlanta Falcons and Washington Redskins
Rich Owens (1994), former National Football League defensive end for the Washington Redskins, Miami Dolphins, Kansas City Chiefs and Seattle Seahawks
Vincent "Pat" Pazzetti (1912), Lehigh quarterback elected to the College Football Hall of Fame in 1961 and General Manager of Bethlehem Steel's Bethlehem plant
Roger Penske (1959), NASCAR and IRL team owner; member of International Motorsports Hall of Fame; recipient of the Presidential Medal of Freedom
Will Rackley (BA Design, 2011), National Football League offensive guard for the Jacksonville Jaguars
Julius Seligson (1930), NCAA and ITA National Tennis Champion, Member, ITA Hall of Fame
Scott Semptimphelter, football player
Lake Underwood (Mech. E.), sports car racer
Bobby Weaver (1981), gold medal winner, wrestling, 1984 Summer Olympics
Finn Wentworth (1980), former owner of New Jersey Nets and President YankeeNets
Adam Williamson (2005), MLS soccer player for the New England Revolution

References 

Lehigh University alumni